The Praga E-40 was a single engine, two seat, biplane basic trainer, built in Czechoslovakia in the mid-1930s.

Design and development

The E-40, one of several Praga trainer designs, was a single-bay biplane with open, tandem cockpits. The swept wings had twin wooden spars and a mixture of plywood and fabric covering.  Ailerons were fitted to the lower wing and the upper wing had a cut-out on its trailing edge to enhance visibility from the forward cockpit.  The N-form interplane struts were steel and the bay braced with streamlined wires. A pair of vertical N-form struts joined the wing centre section to the upper fuselage.  The fixed tail surfaces were wood framed and plywood covered; the tailplane was strut braced from below.  Elevators and rudder were fabric covered over steel frames. The rudder had a trim tab.

The fuselage of the E-40 was a steel structure, rigidly braced at the front and wire braced aft. The nose and the upper decking were covered with detachable steel panels; fabric covering was used elsewhere.  Fuel and engine oil tanks were in the fuselage.  The E-40 was powered by a four-cylinder 63/71 kW (85/95 hp) Walter Minor air-cooled, inverted piston engine driving a two-blade propeller. It had a split type main undercarriage with wheels on V-form legs mounted just forward of the wing leading edge.  Rubber-in-compression spring units were mounted in extended hubs; the pistons of these units were held in place on a shallow, inverted V strut, itself attached to the lower fuselage via a steel tube pyramid.  The tailwheel castored and had rubber springing within the rear fuselage.

Operational history

There are no records of the E-40 entering production and it is possible that only the prototype, OK-EDA, was built.

Specifications

References

E-40
1930s Czechoslovakian aircraft
Single-engined tractor aircraft
Biplanes
Aircraft first flown in 1936